Gunpoint is a 1966 American Western film directed by Earl Bellamy and starring Audie Murphy. It was Murphy's final film for Universal Pictures.

Plot
In a small town in 1880s Colorado, a gang of outlaws led by Drago (Morgan Woodward) rob a train and kidnap a saloon singer, Uvalde (Joan Staley).  Determined to chase them down, the sheriff, Chad Lucas (Audie Murphy), forms a posse which includes Uvalde's fiancé, Nate Harlan (Warren Stevens), a young kid, and Lucas's deputy (Denver Pyle) – who is secretly in league with the outlaws. During the chase Nate realises  that Chad and Uvalde used to be lovers. The posse battles Indians, horse thieves and conflicts among themselves before discovering Uvalde; eventually the sheriff's pursuit is successful.

Cast
 Audie Murphy as Chad Lucas
 Joan Staley as Uvalde
 Warren Stevens as Nate Harlan
 Edgar Buchanan as Bull
 Denver Pyle as Cap Hold
 David Macklin as Mark Emerson
 Nick Dennis as Nicos
 Royal Dano as Ode
 Kelly Thordsen as Ab
 Morgan Woodward as Drago
 William Bramley as Hoag
 Robert Pine as Mitchell
 John Hoyt as Mayor Osborne
 Ford Rainey as Tom Emerson
 Mike Ragan as Zack
 Roy Barcroft as Dr. Beardsley

Production
The film was the last of seven Westerns Audie Murphy made with producer Gordon Kay, starting with Hell Bent for Leather (1960). Parts of the film were shot at Kanab Canyon in Utah. Scenes from earlier Universal films starring Murphy, including Kansas Raiders, The Cimarron Kid, Ride Clear of Diablo, Night Passage, Gunsmoke and Sierra, were re-used in this film.

When Hedda Hopper asked him what the story was about, he told her, "Same story only we're getting older horses". After making the movie, Murphy went to work in Europe for a number of years.

See also
 List of American films of 1966

References

External links
 
 
 
 
 

1966 Western (genre) films
1966 films
American Western (genre) films
Audie Murphy
1960s English-language films
Films directed by Earl Bellamy
Universal Pictures films
Films scored by Hans J. Salter
1960s American films